The Journal of the Royal College of Physicians of Edinburgh is a peer-reviewed medical journal covering research in  clinical medicine, medical education, and the history of medicine, published by the Royal College of Physicians of Edinburgh. It was  established in 1971 as  Chronicle (Royal College of Physicians of Edinburgh), renamed in 1988 to Proceedings of the Royal College of Physicians of Edinburgh, and obtained its current title in 2002.

References

External links
 

Publications established in 1971
History of medicine in the United Kingdom
General medical journals
1971 establishments in Scotland
Quarterly journals
English-language journals
Open access journals